Allie Grant (born February 14, 1994) is an American film and television actress. She is best known for her role as Isabelle Hodes on the Showtime television series Weeds appearing in the series from 2005 to 2009. She also co-starred as Lisa Shay on the ABC sitcom Suburgatory. She has a recurring role on The Goldbergs.

Life and career
Grant was born in Tupelo, Mississippi; her parents are Jerry McClain and Angie Grant McClain. When she was three years old, she went to the Model and Talent Expo in Dallas, Texas. She was invited to New York. From 2005 to 2007, she guest starred on the Disney Channel series, The Suite Life of Zack & Cody and That's So Raven.

In 2005, she was cast in Weeds. Although she originally began as a recurring character, Grant's role was promoted and by season three she became a regular part of the cast. Her role as Isabelle Hodes, the lesbian daughter of Celia and Dean Hodes, earned her a SAG nomination as a part of the Weeds cast.

Grant has also appeared in the films Fanboys (2009), The Runaways (2010) and Struck by Lightning (2012).

Filmography

Film

Television

Awards

References

External links

 

1994 births
Actresses from Mississippi
American child actresses
American film actresses
American television actresses
Living people
People from Tupelo, Mississippi
21st-century American actresses